Thomas Dickson  (born 8 July 1974) is a retired sprinter from Saint Vincent and the Grenadines who specialized in the 400 metres.

At the 1996 Summer Olympics, he participated in the 4 x 400 metres relay. The relay team, consisting of Eswort Coombs, Dickson, Eversley Linley, and Erasto Sampson, set a national record there with 3:06.52 minutes. Dickson's personal best time in the 400 metres is 46.94 seconds, achieved in 1998.

References

1974 births
Living people
Saint Vincent and the Grenadines male sprinters
Athletes (track and field) at the 1996 Summer Olympics
Olympic athletes of Saint Vincent and the Grenadines
Athletes (track and field) at the 1999 Pan American Games
Pan American Games competitors for Saint Vincent and the Grenadines